In botanical nomenclature, a validly published name is a name that meets the requirements in the International Code of Nomenclature for algae, fungi, and plants for valid publication. Valid publication of a name represents the minimum requirements for a botanical name to exist: terms that appear to be names but have not been validly published are referred to in the ICN as "designations".

A validly published name may not satisfy all the requirements to be legitimate. It is also not necessarily the correct name for a particular taxon and rank.

Nevertheless, invalid names (nomen invalidum, nom. inval.) are sometimes in use. This may occur when a taxonomist finds and recognises a taxon and thinks of a name, but delays publishing it in an adequate manner. A common reason for this is that a taxonomist intends to write a magnum opus that provides an overview of the group, rather than a series of small papers. Another reason is that the code of nomenclature changes with time, and most changes have retroactive effect, which has resulted in some names that the author thought were validly published, becoming invalid.

Contrast to zoology
In zoology, the term "valid name" has a different meaning, analogous to (corresponding to) the botanical term "correct name". The term "validly published name" is more like (and it corresponds to) the zoological term "available name".

See also
 Nomen nudum, a particular kind of invalid name in zoology and botany
 Undescribed taxon, recognized as distinct by at least one biologist, but the name is not validly published

References

Botanical nomenclature